Exaeretia amurella is a moth in the family Depressariidae. It was described by Alexandr L. Lvovsky in 1990. It is found in southern Siberia, Buryatia, Transbaikalia and northern Mongolia.

References

Moths described in 1990
Exaeretia
Moths of Asia